Berocynta is a monotypic moth genus of the family Erebidae. Its only species, Berocynta simplex, is found in Jamaica. Both the genus and the species were first described by Heinrich Benno Möschler in 1886.

References

Hypeninae
Monotypic moth genera